Saulspoort (also known as Moruleng) is a village at the northern foot of the Pilanesberg, about 65 km north of Rustenburg. It was named after a former baKgatla chief, Tsheole, called Saul by the early settlers.

It was established when Henri Gonin, a Swiss missionary with the Dutch Reformed Church preaching to the baKgatla tribe, moved to Saulspoort farm, which was owned by the later president Paul Kruger; Kruger eventually sold the farm to Gonin in 1869. In 1895 the baKgatla purchased most of Saulspoort from Gonin.

References

Populated places in the Moses Kotane Local Municipality